Unia Kunice is a football (soccer) club based in Żary, Poland.

The club played in the III liga in 2007–08 and 2008–09, but was thereafter relegated to the Klasa okręgowa.

References

External links 
 Official website
 90minut.pl profile

Football clubs in Poland
Association football clubs established in 1946
1946 establishments in Poland
Football clubs in Lubusz Voivodeship
Żary County